Family Values Tour '98 may refer to these live recordings:

 Family Values Tour '98 (album)
 Family Values Tour '98 (video)

See also
 Family Values Tour 1998, the music tour